Purulia railway station serves Purulia City the headquarters of Purulia district in the Indian state of West Bengal. It is situated at the eastern side of the city with railway owned colonies which is home for working staffs. The station is under NSG4 category.

Purulia railway station is presently a three-way junction point having direct connection to Asansol/Adra, Muri/Bokaro/Ranchi and Tatanagar/Chakradharpur.

12828 Purulia–Howrah Superfast Express is the most important and oldest train of the whole region that connects to Kolkata. 12884 Purulia–Howrah Rupashi Bangla Express is another direct option running on the counter times of 12827/28. 12866 Purulia–Howrah Lalmati Express(via TATA) is a bi-weekly train meant to cater extra rush between the two. 12801 Purushottam SF Express is the only daily link to New Delhi. 22605 Purulia–Villupuram Weekly Superfast Express is another important train connecting to Vellore that originates from here. 12801 Purushottam SF Express is the only daily link to New Delhi. 12152 Samarsata SF Express is the bi-weekly train to LTT-Mumbai.
Totos (e-rickshaws) are available for local transport. Taxi and Maxi is available for long-distance travels from the station.

History
The Bengal Nagpur Railway was formed in 1887 for the purpose of upgrading the Nagpur Chhattisgarh Railway and then extending it via Bilaspur to Asansol, in order to develop a shorter Howrah–Mumbai route than the one via Allahabad. The Bengal Nagpur Railway main line from Nagpur to Asansol, on the Howrah–Delhi main line, was opened for goods traffic on 1 February 1891.

The Purulia–Ranchi line was opened as a narrow-gauge railway of BNR in 1907. The Ranchi–Kotshila section was upgraded to broad gauge in 1960 and the Kotshila–Purulia section subsequently.

Electrification
The Purulia–Chakradharpur, Kandra–Gomharria, Sini–Adityapur, Adityapur–Tatanagar,  Chakradharpur–Manoharpur and Manoharpur–Rourkela sections were electrified in 1961–62.

References

External links
  Trains at Purulia

Adra railway division
Railway stations in Purulia district
Railway stations in India opened in 1890
Railway junction stations in West Bengal